An Evening With Belafonte/Mouskouri is an album by Harry Belafonte and Nana Mouskouri, released by RCA Victor (LPM/LSP-3415) in 1966.

Track listing
 "My Moon"
 "Dream"
 "If You Are Thirsty"
 "The Train"
 "In the Small Boat"
 "The Town Crier"
 "Walking on the Moon"
 "The Baby Snake"
 "The Wide Sea"
 "Irene"

Personnel
Harry Belafonte – vocals (1, 3, 5, 7, 9, 10)
Nana Mouskouri – vocals (2, 3, 4, 6, 8, 10)
George Petsilas – guitar, bouzouki
Ernie Calabria – guitar
Jay Berliner – guitar
John Cartwright – bass
Percy Brice – percussion
Ralph MacDonald – percussion
Production notes:
Andy Wiswell – producer
Musical direction and choral arrangements by Howard Roberts
Harry Belafonte – executive producer
Bob Simpson – engineer

References

1966 live albums
Harry Belafonte live albums
Collaborative albums
Nana Mouskouri albums
RCA Records live albums
Vocal duet albums